Michael Enu (born 16 April 1997) is a Ghanaian professional footballer who plays as a defender for Ghanaian Premier League side Ashanti Gold.

Career 
Enu previously plied his trade with Dansoman-based club Liberty Professionals before joining Ashanti Gold. He made 12 league appearances in the 2019–20 Ghana Premier League season before the league was put on hold and later cancelled due to the COVID-19 pandemic. In April 2020, he was signed by the Obuasi-based club Ashanti Gold on a 3-year deal. He was a member of the squad that featured for the club in the 2020–21 CAF Confederation Cup. He won the match of the match award on 18 January 2021, in a goalless draw league match against Medeama SC after helping the club keep a clean sheet.

References

External links 

 
 

Living people
1997 births
Ghana Premier League players
Liberty Professionals F.C. players
Ashanti Gold SC players
Association football defenders
Ghanaian footballers